Weiss or Weiß may refer to:

People
 Weiss (surname), including spelling Weiß
 Weiss Ferdl (1883-1949), German actor

Places
 Mount Weiss, Jasper National Park, Alberta, Canada
 Weiss Lake, Alabama
 Weiß (Sieg), a river in North Rhine-Westphalia, Germany
 Weiss (river), a river in Haut-Rhin, France
 Weiss (crater), on the Moon

In military affairs
 , several ships
 Fall Weiss (Case or Plan White), German military operations:
 Fall Weiss (1939), against Poland
 Fall Weiss, 1943 Case White offensive in Yugoslavia

Other uses
 Weiß, "first" album in Weiß & Schwarz pair of simultaneous Böhse Onkelz releases
 Nathan Weiss Graduate College, New Jersey, United States
 Weiss Amphitheater, a caldera in Marie Byrd Land, Antarctica
 Weiss Hall, a dormitory of Wilkes University, Wilkes-Barre, Pennsylvania, on the National Register of Historic Places
 Weiss, a fictional character in the light novel series The Saga of Tanya the Evil
 Weiss Schnee, a fictional character in the anime series RWBY

See also
 Weisshorn, a mountain in the Alps
 Wheat beer or Weissbier, a type of beer
 Weis (disambiguation)
 Weise (disambiguation)
 Weisse (disambiguation)
 Weisz (disambiguation)